Bangladesh Railway is the state-owned rail transport agency of Bangladesh. It operates and maintains all railways in the country, and is overseen by the Directorate General of Bangladesh Railway. The Bangladesh Railway is governed by the Ministry of Railways and the Bangladesh Railway Authority. Its reporting mark is "BR".

The Bangladesh Railway system has a total length of  In 2009, Bangladesh Railway had 34,168 employees. In 2014, Bangladesh Railway carried 65 million passengers and 2.52 million tonnes of freight. The railway made 8,135 million passenger-kilometres and 677 million tonne-kilometres.

History

On 1 January 1871, extension of Darshana - Jogotee Railway line up to Goalanda by Eastern Bengal Railway. On 4 January 1885, a further 14.98 km  (metre gauge) line was opened. In 1891, the Bengal Assam Railway was constructed with the assistance of the government. It was later run by the Bengal Assam Railway Company.

On 1 July 1895, two sections of metre gauge railway were constructed by English railway companies. One connected Chattogram and Comilla {convert|150.6|km|mi}}. The other connected Laksam Upazila and Chandpur {convert|51.2|km|mi}}.

In 1947, at the time of the Partition of India, the Bengal Assam Railway was divided into two parts. The 2,603.92 km of track located in East Pakistan, came under the control of the central Government of Pakistan. On 1 February 1961, the Eastern Bengal Railway was renamed the Pakistan Eastern Railway. In 1962, control of the Pakistan Eastern Railway was transferred to the Government of East Pakistan. On 9 June 1962, by order of the president, the Pakistan Eastern Railway management was assumed by a Railway Board.

In 1998, the Jamuna Bridge was built to connect the previously divided east and west rail networks in dual gauge. Bangladesh is currently converting its Railway system in to Dual Gauge system to enable both Broad Gauge & Meter Gauge trains to run & developing extensive railway transport relations with India. With Bangladesh & Indian Government working side by side, atleast 9 International Rail Transit System (IRTS) have come up presently in Bangladesh. They are as follows: - 1. Kolkata-Darsana-Iswardi-Dhaka; 2. Kolkata-Bangaon-Jessore-Khulna; 3. New Jalpaiguri-Haldibari-Chilahati-Iswardi-Dhaka; 4. Changrabandha-Burimari-Lalmonirhat-Teesta-Kaunia-Parbatipur; 5. Parbatipur-Dinajpur-Birol-Radhikapur-Raiganj-Barsoi; 6. Badarpur-Karimganj-Maishasan-Shabazpur-Kulaura-Sylhet/Chittagong; 7. Agartala-Akhaura-Dhaka/Chittagong; 8. Old Malda-Singhabad-Rohanpur-Rajshahi; 9. Eklakhi-Balurghat-Hili. While route 1, 2, 3, 5 & 8 are already operational, route 4 & 6 are being restored with route 7 & 9 currently nearing construction completion.      

In 2010, funding was received for a bridge over the Titas River. In September 2010, the Government of Bangladesh approved ten rail development projects costing 19·9 billion Bangladeshi taka including plans for new tracks and rolling stock.

In 2011, Sheikh Hasina Wazed, the Prime Minister of Bangladesh, officiated at the start of construction of a link which would cross several rivers to reach Cox's Bazar. The  of dual gauge line started from the railhead at Dohazari, southeast of Chittagong. The plan was to reach Satkania, Dulahazra, Chakarin, Edgaon, Ramu and Cox's Bazar, with four major river bridges and a  branch from Ramu to Gundum. In 2013, the Chhattogram Circular Railway was completed.

In 2015, construction of a  branch to Agartala, Tripura in Northeast India commenced. In 2017, land acquisition took place to facilitate the construction.

Structure
 
From the end of the Bangladesh Liberation War in 1971 until 1982, the railway was governed by a Railway Board. It then came under the Railway Division of the Ministry of Communications. The Director General of the railway was the Secretary of the Railway Division of the Ministry of Communications. In 1995, governance of the railway was assumed by the "Bangladesh Railway Authority" which was chaired by the Minister of Railways. Inspections are made by an external government authority.

The features of Bangladesh Railway include the usage of several gauges and the division of the rail system by the Jamuna River, Brahmaputra into the Western Zone and the Eastern Zone of operations. Crossing the river is one bridge, the Jamuna Bridge which was completed in 2003.

The East Zone and the West Zone each have a General Manager who answers to the Director General of the Railway Authority. Each zone has its own raft of departments for operation, maintenance, and finances. Each zone is divided into two divisions with departments for personnel, transportation, commercial, finance mechanical, way and works signalling, telecommunication, electrical and medical services.

The East Zone has a workshop division in Pahartali. The West Zone's workshop division is in Saidpur. The railway has a central locomotive workshop for broad and metre gauge locomotives in Parbatipur. It also has a Railway Training Academy. There are diesel workshops in Pahartali, Dhaka and Parbatipur. Maintenance on coaches and wagons is carried out at the "C and W" shop in Saidpur, Nilphamari and at the "C and W" shop Pahartali.

Rolling stock

Locomotives

Diesel

Bangladesh Railway's fleet of diesel locomotives includes both diesel-electric and diesel-hydraulic machines. In 2007, there were 77 broad gauge diesel-electric locomotives. In 2012, Bangladesh Railway ordered 16 new broad gauge locomotives of 3100 hp from Banaras Locomotive Works, India. There were also 208 metre gauge diesel-electric locomotives including those of classes 2000, 2600, 2700, and 2900. The total number was 285.

In 2019, 40 EMD GT42ACLs were ordered from Progress Rail.

On 27 July 2020 Indian Railways (IR) handed over 10 WDM-3D diesel locomotives to Bangladesh Railway under its "grant assistance" plan. The vehicles cost an estimated ₹600m ($US 8m) to manufacture.

Steam
A small number of steam locomotives are preserved in Bangladesh.

The 762 mm gauge locomotives are from the Rupsa  Bagerhat railway which was the only 762 mm gauge line in East Pakistan in 1947. It was changed to 1,676 mm gauge in 1970.

Freight and cargo services
As a national carrier, Bangladesh Railway is obliged to carry essential commodities such as grain and fertiliser to remote parts of Bangladesh at discounted rates. Bangladesh Railway transports containers from the Port of Chittagong to Dhaka Inland Container Depot, where there are customs facilities. The rolling stock to carry containers was manufactured from existing stock. On 5 August 1991, a container-only train came into service. A goods train operates from Singhabad and Petrapole, India to Rohanpur and Benapole, Bangladesh.

Accidents 
 On 10 July 2014, a major freight train accident occurred near Faujdarhat Railway Station at 6.30 am. Six wagons of the train derailed and oil from three of the wagons flowed into a nearby canal.
 On 14 September 2016, a freight train derailed in the Faujdarhat area. The loco driver and the assistant driver were injured.

Passenger services

Railway is a principal mode of transport in Bangladesh. In the 2005 financial year, 42 million passengers travelled on the Bangladesh Railway. Inter-city services, contribute to over seventy percent of Bangladesh Railway's revenue. In 2014, the railway owned 312 broad gauge coaches and 1,164 metre gauge coaches.

In 2017, Bangladesh Railway operated 90 inter-city trains (up & down), 52 mail or express trains, 64 commuter trains (DEMU), 135 shuttle or local trains and 2 international services.

Two times per week, a passenger train operates a service to India. In April 2008, the Maitri Express between Dhaka and Kolkata came into operation on the Gede  Darsana route. On 9 November 2017, a new weekly train, the Bandhan Express, came into operation between Khulna and Kolkata via Petrapole and Benapole (172 km).

Tickets for Bangladesh Railway services are available at all stations. Most stations are computerised and tickets which can be purchased within four days of departure, are printed. Full refunds (excluding clerical charges) are available up until two days before departure. The railway reserves ten percent of tickets for online sales. Of these tickets, fifteen percent are reserved for mobile phone sales.

Accidents
 On 19 April 1965, East Pakistan army attacked Parbatipur-Sealdah East Bengal Mail, Goalundo Ghat-Sealdah East Bengal Express & Darjeeling Mail, killing 200 passengers onboard these trains. These incidents stopped rail connections between West Bengal & East Bengal until 2008. 
 On 1970, the Bhola Cyclone destroyed railway line & connections between Khulna & Barisal via Bagerhat.  
 On 12 February 1971(date disputed), East Pakistan army bombed atleast 10 passenger trains throughout Dhaka, Rajshahi, Khulna, Chittagong & Sylhet in connection to Military Operation Searchlight. Nearly 1000 people died with many injured.  
 On 11 July 2006, a train collided with a crowded bus at an unmanned railroad crossing at Akkelpur Upazila, Jaipurhat District. Thirty-three people died and thirty were injured.
 On 13 October 2007, the rear carriages of the Probhati Express derailed near Dhaka. Four people died and fifty were injured.
 On 16 April 2008, a Dinajpur  Dhaka Ekota express train collided with a local bus on a level crossing on the outskirts of Kalihati, Tangail District. Eighteen people died and thirty were injured.
 On 14 May 2008, an Upaban express train crashed into the rear of a Noakhali express train at the Ashuganj Upazila station, Brahmanbaria District. Eight people died and one hundred were injured.
 On 8 December 2010, a collision between two passenger trains killed at least ten people.
 On 23 June 2019, several bogies of Dhaka-bound Upaban Express train from Sylhet veered off the tracks at around 11:40 pm after a culvert over the Barochhara Canal broke down, 200 yards off Baramchal Railway Station. At least five people died and hundreds were injured. Locals who worked overnight with the first responders claimed at least 10-15 people have been killed.
 On 12 November 2019, At least 16 passengers died and score other injured as Dhaka-bound Turni Nishita Express rammed Chattogram-bound Udayan Express from Sylhet at Mandobagh Railway Station in Kasba.Train Driver's Fault' Takes Sixteen Lives
 On 14 November 2019, Two days after a deadly train crash in Brahmanbaria, Rangpur Express, bound from Dhaka to Rangpur, braced an accident at Ullapara station in Sirajganj at around 2pm on Thursday. Seven compartments of Rangpur Express, including its engine and power car, derailed in the Ullapara Railway Station area and a fire broke out in three of its compartments.

Accommodation classes

Bangladesh Railway has three main passenger classes, "Air conditioned", "First" and "Second". Most trains do not provide the "Air conditioned" class. On inter-city and long-distance trains, a restaurant car and a power car are included at the centre of the train. All inter-city trains are partially air-conditioned, feature padded leather seats and provide passengers with on-demand sheets, pillows, blankets, as well as meals in a dining car. Some dieselelectric trains provides commuter services.

Railway stations 
Kamalapur Railway Station is the central railway station in Dhaka. Other major stations are Rajshahi railway station, Chattogram railway station.
In 2015, Bangladesh Railway serviced 489 railway stations. These include one block hut, thirteen train halts, and four goods booking points. The schedule of Bangladesh Railway has changed 26 Trains in the new year 2020. The East zone Train schedule will active on 10 January 2020.

See also 

 Transport in Bangladesh
 Kalni Express
 Lalmoni Express
 Dhaka–Chittagong high-speed railway
 Bangladesh Railway Museum
 Railway Nirapatta Bahini

References

External links
 Official site, timetables

 
Railway companies of Bangladesh
Government-owned railway companies